Baby Tuckoo was an English hard rock band, formed in Bradford, West Yorkshire, England in 1982. Their name is taken from the first sentence of the James Joyce novel A Portrait of the Artist as a Young Man.  They were generally considered a part of the second generation of new wave of British heavy metal.

They released two albums with Rob Armitage (vocals), Neil Saxton (guitar), Andy Barrott (keyboards, guitar), Paul Smith (bass) and Tony Sugden (drums).  Prior to their recording career, Steve Holton (vocals) and Andy Tidswell (keyboards) were in the band.

Armitage left to join Accept in 1987, but was replaced by the American David Reece in 1988 without having taken part in any releases from the band. He later joined the UK outfit Jagged Edge, and founded a band named Passion.

Discography

Albums
1984: First Born (Ultranoise)
1986: Force Majeure (Music for Nations)

Singles and EPs
1984: "Mony Mony" (Albion) - single
1986: "Rock (Rock)" (Music for Nations) - single and EP
1986: "The Tears of a Clown" (Fun After All) - EP (The A-side, a Smokey Robinson & the Miracles cover, was not included on any Baby Tuckoo album)

See also
List of new wave of British heavy metal bands

References

English hard rock musical groups
Musical groups established in 1982
1982 establishments in England
New Wave of British Heavy Metal musical groups